The Doctor Who 50 years trailer is a sixty-second television trailer which promoted "The Day of the Doctor", the fiftieth anniversary special episode of the British science fiction television series Doctor Who. Filmed across two days in a studio, it stars Matt Smith as the Eleventh Doctor, with multiple other actors providing images and poses of the key characters, over whom features of the original actors would be placed. The trailer premiered on BBC One on 19 October 2013.

Summary 
The sixty-second trailer features a 3D bullet time sequence through a frozen landscape filled with images from the show's history, including the Doctor, many of his companions, and enemies, as well as a multitude of props from the show's episodes. During this, the Eleventh Doctor (Matt Smith) narration talks about him running "all my lives". The trailer ends as the Doctor reveals the day that he's been running from: "The Day of the Doctor".

Filming and production 
Red Bee Media, which had previously produced trailers for Doctor Who such as the 2008 campfire trailer, conceived the basic outline for the 50 years trailer, to emphasise the fact that "The Day of the Doctor" would be shown in 3D. Major elements of the trailer were recorded on 15–16 August 2013, at Black Island Studios in London. During filming, actors were hired to pose as the key characters, over whom the features of the original actors would be placed. The actors were:

Andy McInnes as the First Doctor
Stephen Rose as the Second Doctor
Jon Crowley as the Third Doctor
Paul Hughes as the Fourth Doctor
Nic Zabilowicz as the Fifth Doctor
Chris Laurens as the Sixth Doctor
Jim Ewan as the War Doctor
Robert Ratajczak as the Ninth Doctor
Josh Sutherland as the Tenth Doctor
Jan Hoffman as the Eleventh Doctor
Ami Kandel as Clara Oswald and Sarah Jane Smith
Robert David Cashin as the Master
Natalie Wood as Rose Tyler
Bella Sabbagh as Donna Noble
Naomi Delrme as Amy Pond
Valona Irons as Martha Jones
Joseph Paxton as the policeman
Michael Pearson as the soldier and the Dalek victim

The images of Matt Smith (Eleventh Doctor) and Jenna Coleman (Clara Oswald) were captured on 2 September 2013 in London, while Smith's narration was recorded on 5 October. Many of the camera movements were recreated in the software Flame. To do this, the cameras were tracked and stabilised, before being recreated into a stable camera movement. This stable movement allowed the inclusion of more subtle references from the show.

The still of William Hartnell (First Doctor) is the first image of the actor to be presented in high-resolution colour. To create the image, director Matt Lossaso sourced a black-and-white image from the episode The Web Planet (1965), and spent hours placing elements from a double over the top of the original still in Adobe Photoshop to manipulate the image to colour. Following this, Framestore visual effects supervisor Oliver Bersey added slight edits, before adding subtle 2D manipulations to give a 3D effect. Bersey also created a matte painting of the vast landscape that appears at the end of the trailer.

References

External links

2013 in British television
British television commercials
2010s television commercials
Works about Doctor Who
Golden jubilees